Events from the year 1117 in Ireland.

Incumbents
High King of Ireland: Domnall Ua Lochlainn

Events

Births

Deaths
 Diarmait mac Énna meic Murchada ruler of the kingdoms of Leinster and Dublin.

References

 
1170s in Ireland
Ireland